Russian Helicopters was a Russian UCI Continental cycling team.

2014 team roster
As of 1 January 2014.

Major wins
Source:
2013
 Stage 4 Grand Prix of Adygeya, Alexander Foliforov
 Stage 5 Grand Prix of Adygeya, Mamyr Stash

2014
 Stage 3 Grand Prix of Sochi, Alexander Evtushenko
 Stage 3 Grand Prix of Adygeya, Andrey Sazanov
 Stage 5 Grand Prix Udmurtskaya Pravda, Evgeny Kovalev

References

Defunct cycling teams based in Russia
Cycling teams established in 2013
Cycling teams disestablished in 2014
UCI Continental Teams (Europe)
2013 establishments in Russia
2014 disestablishments in Russia